Judith Steinberg Dean (born May 9, 1953) is an American physician from Burlington, Vermont. She is the wife of Howard Dean, the former Governor of Vermont and past chairman of the Democratic National Committee. Steinberg Dean was the First Lady of Vermont from 1991 until 2003.

Early life
Judith Steinberg grew up on Long Island in Roslyn, outside New York City. Her parents were both doctors, and her family was Jewish.

She earned her bachelor's degree  in biochemistry at Princeton University and then received her Doctor of Medicine degree from Albert Einstein College of Medicine of Yeshiva University, where she met fellow medical student Howard Dean.

Career
After completing a fellowship in hematology at McGill University in Montreal, Steinberg moved to Burlington, Vermont, with Dean in order to set up their joint medical practice.  She uses her family name "Dr. Steinberg" while in her practice to differentiate herself from her husband.

As her husband served in the Vermont House of Representatives, and as Lieutenant Governor and Governor, she remained working full-time in her practice. She did not campaign with her husband in his quest for the U.S. Democratic presidential nomination in 2004 until after he lost the Iowa caucuses.

Personal life
She married Howard Dean in 1981. They have two children, both of whom have been raised in and identify in the Jewish faith.

References

1953 births
20th-century American Jews
Physicians from Vermont
First Ladies and Gentlemen of Vermont
Living people
People from Burlington, Vermont
People from Roslyn, New York
Princeton University alumni
Albert Einstein College of Medicine alumni
McGill University people
21st-century American Jews
20th-century American women
21st-century American women